Chase is a census-designated place (CDP) in Jackson Township, Luzerne County, Pennsylvania, United States. The CDP population was 978 at the 2010 census.

Geography

Chase is centered on the intersection of Huntsville Road and Chase Road (in a valley to the north of Larksville Mountain).

Demographics

References

Census-designated places in Luzerne County, Pennsylvania
Census-designated places in Pennsylvania